Rosette Kajungu Mutambi (born October 26, 1964) is a Ugandan professional social worker and journalist, a politician and legislator who represents the people of Mbarara district as district woman representative in the Parliament of Uganda. She is a member of the National Resistance Movement(NRM) party, the party in political leadership in Uganda under the chairmanship of Yoweri Kaguta Museveni president of the republic of Uganda.

Education background  
Kajungu Mutambi studied her O'level education from Maryhill High School where she undertook her Uganda Certificate of Education(UCE) in 1981. She later enrolled at Bweranyangi Girls' Senior Secondary School for her A'level education and did the Uganda Advanced Certificate of Education (UACE) examinations in 1984 thereafter joining Makerere University where she graduated with a bachelor's degree in arts in 1988. She earned a certificate in public relations from (MTAC) Nakawa in 1992 and added a diploma in journalism in 1993 from Uganda Management Institute (UMI). She later pursued an advanced certificate in journalism from the International Institute for Journalism Berlin in 1996 and added a postgraduate diploma in management from the university of Leicester in 2008. She is currently pursuing a master's degree in social sector planning and management from Makerere University.

Career 
Kajungu Mutambi was the founder/executive director of HEPS Uganda coalition for health promotion from 2000 to 2016,. She was a volunteer coordinator of Health Action east Africa from 1998 to 2000 and was information officer in the ministry of information and broadcasting/office of the president from 1990 to 1998. Between 1994 and 1996, Kajungu Mutambi was deputy manager, AIDS control programme, was a research assistant at Recon Uganda limited from 1987 to 1989, and was a community health consultant from 2002 to date. She is currently a woman member of parliament of Uganda since 2016. In parliament, she serves on the committee on local government accounts and the committee on health. She is a member of Uganda Women Parliamentary Association (UWOPA) where she is the chairperson of the succession act round table committee.

Kajungu Mutambi has membership in professional bodies; Uganda media women association as a full member and an associate member in the Association of social workers.

References 

National Resistance Movement politicians
Ugandan journalists
Ugandan social workers
1964 births
Living people
Women members of the Parliament of Uganda
Ugandan women journalists
Members of the Parliament of Uganda
Makerere University alumni
21st-century Ugandan politicians
21st-century Ugandan women politicians